Harmans Water is a suburb of Bracknell, in the English county of Berkshire, formerly part of the parish of Winkfield. It takes its name from Harman's Water Lake, long gone. Building of the estate began around 1960 and was the fourth and last estate to be built as part of the original plan for the new town.
 
It is in Harmans Water ward, which following boundary changes now includes parts of Bullbrook, Martins Heron and  The Parks.

Facilities include a shopping centre, a library, several public houses and Harmans Water Primary School . St. Pauls Church has shared Church of England and United Reformed Church services and is situated adjacent to the shopping centre. There are a few office buildings in Broad Lane but otherwise the estate is largely residential.

The Parks
The Parks is a recent development and is on the site of the former RAF Staff College which closed in 1997. The first phase of the development, of 220 homes was developed by English Partnerships and completed in 2008. As of 2016 development continues with a further 530 homes and is due to be completed in 2017.

Ramslade House, the former headquarters building of the RAF staff college, was originally planned to become a community centre but was demolished in 2016 to make way for a development of 12 townhouses being built by Taylor Wimpey.

References

Bracknell
Suburbs in the United Kingdom